Solomon Airlines operates flights to the following destinations.

List

Current destinations

Former destinations

References

Lists of airline destinations